Schöneberg is a district of Berlin, Germany

Schöneberg may also refer to:

Schöneberg, Brandenburg, a municipality in the district of Uckermark, Brandenburg, Germany
Schöneberg, Altenkirchen, a municipality in the district of Altenkirchen, Rhineland-Palatinate, Germany
Schöneberg, Bad Kreuznach, a municipality in the district of Bad Kreuznach, Rhineland-Palatinate, Germany
Schöneberg (Hofgeismar), a neighborhood in Hofgeismar, in the district of Kassel, in northern Hesse, Germany

See also
 Schönberg (disambiguation)
 Schönenberg (disambiguation)
 Schoenberg